Lectionary 297 (Gregory-Aland), designated by siglum ℓ 297 (in the Gregory-Aland numbering) is a Greek manuscript of the New Testament, on parchment. Palaeographically it has been assigned to the 13th century. The manuscript is lacunose.

Description 

The original codex contained lessons from the Gospel of John, Matthew, and Luke (Evangelistarium), on 230 parchment leaves, with some lacunae. The leaves are measured. It contains Menologion on folios 171-320, accompanied by Apostolarion (lessons from Book of Acts and Epistles).

The text is written in Greek minuscule letters, in two columns per page, 23 lines per page. It contains breathings and accents. The ink is brown. There are a few headpieces and decorated initial letters.

The manuscript contains weekday Gospel lessons for Church reading from Easter to Pentecost and Saturday/Sunday Gospel lessons for the other weeks.

History 

Gregory dated the manuscript to the 12th century. It is presently assigned by the INTF to the 13th century.

Edward Everett, an American educator (who later gained fame as a politician, diplomat, and orator), bought the manuscript in 1819, during his first visit in Greece, along with six other Greek manuscripts. Everett used every opportunity of searching for Greek manuscripts. He brought the manuscript to America.

The manuscript was added to the list of New Testament manuscripts by Caspar René Gregory (number 297e). Scrivener catalogued this manuscript as 484e on his list. The manuscript was examined by Edward A. Guy, who designated it by siglum 2h (Lectionary 296 received siglum 1h, Lectionary 298 – 3h). Gregory saw the manuscript in 1878. It was examined and described by Herman C. Hoskier.

The manuscript is not cited in the critical editions of the Greek New Testament (UBS3).

Currently the codex is housed at the Houghton Library (fMS Gr 7 vol.1) in the Harvard University.

See also 

 List of New Testament lectionaries
 Biblical manuscript
 Textual criticism
 Lectionary 172

Notes and references

Bibliography 

 Josiah Quincy, The History of Harvard University, II. Cambridge: J. Owen, 1840, p. 588.
 
 K. Clark, Descriptive catalogue of Greek New Testament manuscripts in America (1937), pp. 110-112.

External links 
 Library catalogue Harvard.edu

Greek New Testament lectionaries
13th-century biblical manuscripts